Anna Sara Christina Engh (born Nordell) (born February 19, 1982) is a Swedish singer. "Drømmer jeg?"da, performed with Danish (Johnny Deluxe, Johnny Deluxe (Band))da reached the top 5 on the MTV Up North chart. Nordell also wrote a song for the soundtrack of the Swedish movie Det blir aldrig som man tänkt sig and performed "I’ll Still Love You Then" for the soundtrack of the Message in a Bottle.

Nordell's voice is featured in Bomfunk MC's' "Turn It Up", 2005 Rock Angelz album and in Celine Dion's album One Heart. Her other back vocals include those provided for Victoria Beckham, Tata Young, Dannii Minogue, Fredrik Kempe, Mauro Scocco, G.E.S., E-Type and Vanessa Hudgens' "Whatever will be".. Nordell also did some dubbing

When she was 14 Nordell got to play the part of Leisl in the musical The Sound of Music at Göta Lejon Theatre in Stockholm. One of Nordell's songs, "Giving up", ended up on a compilation record Fame factory 4.

References

External links
Official site
Där finns du än video
Mighty 44 feat. Anna Nordell video
Anorah page at MySpace

1982 births
Living people
21st-century Swedish singers
21st-century Swedish women singers